The 2022 AFF Championship Final was the final of the 2022 AFF Championship, the 14th edition of the top-level Association of Southeast Asian Nations (ASEAN) football tournament organised by the ASEAN Football Federation (AFF).

The final was contested in two-legged home-and-away format between Vietnam and Thailand. The first leg was hosted by Vietnam at the Mỹ Đình National Stadium in Hanoi on 13 January 2023, while the second leg was hosted by Thailand at the Thammasat Stadium in Pathum Thani on 16 January 2023.

Background 
This was the fourth AFF Championship final for Vietnam, having won in 2008 and 2018 finals, but lost in 1998 final.

This was the tenth AFF Championship final for Thailand, having won the 1996, 2000, 2002, 2014, 2016, and 2020 finals, and lost in 2007, 2008, and 2012 finals.

Both were the strongest-ranked AFF teams in the FIFA World Rankings; Vietnam was ranked first in Southeast Asia and 96th overall while Thailand was ranked 2nd in Southeast Asia and ranked 111th. Both teams have the second-highest win percentage in the AFF Championship finals behind Singapore (67% each). Thailand was leading the all-time championship table with six titles to their name while Vietnam, on the other hand, only won two in 2008 and 2018. They had met only in 2008 AFF Championship Final, where Vietnam won 3–2 on aggregate (won 2–1 in the first leg; and drew 1–1 in the second). In all competitions since Vietnam's reintegration, Thailand won 16 meetings, Vietnam won only 3, and 7 matches ended in draws.

This final between the two countries is highly anticipated after 15 years.

Route to the final

Matches

First leg

Second leg

References

External links 
 AFF Mitsubishi Electric Cup Official website
 ASEAN Federation Official website

Final
Vietnam national football team matches
Thailand national football team matches
AFF Championship Finals
AFF Championship Final
AFF Championship Final
2023 in Vietnamese football
2023 in Thai football